Bashir Ahmad (born 13 March 1995) is an Afghan cricketer. He made his first-class debut for Boost Region in the 2019 Ahmad Shah Abdali 4-day Tournament on 29 April 2019.

References

External links
 

1995 births
Living people
Afghan cricketers
Boost Defenders cricketers